Akkaraikodiveri is a panchayat town in Erode district in the Indian state of Tamil Nadu.

Demographics
 India census, Akkaraikodiveri had a population of 11,444. Males constitute 51% of the population and females 49%.Akkaraikodiveri has an average literacy rate of 59%, lower than the national average of 59.5%: male literacy is 67%, and female literacy is 50%. In Akkaraikodiveri, 9% of the population is under 6 years of age.

References

Cities and towns in Erode district